is an underground metro station located in Kawanayama-chō, Shōwa-ku, Nagoya, Aichi Prefecture, Japan operated by the Nagoya Municipal Subway's Tsurumai Line. It is located 14.1 rail kilometers from the terminus of the Tsurumai Line at Kami-Otai Station.

History
Irinaka Station was opened on 18 March 1977.

Lines

 (Station number: T14)

Layout
Irinaka Station has two underground opposed side platforms. The platform layout is as follows:

Platforms

References

External links

 Irinaka Station official web site 

Railway stations in Japan opened in 1977
Railway stations in Aichi Prefecture